Armando Andrade Tudela (born 1975, Lima, Peru) is an artist living and working in St Etienne, France and Berlin, Germany.

Andrade studied at Pontifícia Universidad Católica del Perú in Lima, Perú, the Royal College of Art, London, and at the Jan Van Eyck Akademie, Maastricht. He was a founding member of the artist-run space and art collective Espacio La Culpable, Lima, Perú.

Andrade has taken part in the 2006 São Paulo Biennial, the 2006 Shanghai Biennial and the 2005 Torino Triennale.

His 2006 solo show, INKA SNOW is an extension of the artist's ongoing research practice into forms of Tropical Modernism. In previous works, like CAMION (2004), his series of Billboard Photographs (2004-5) and Fragmentos de Escultura (2005), the artist has recombined existing and imagined forms out of a growing interest in local manifestations of the informal that occur on the precarious boundary between the historic and the new.

References

External links
 Armando Andrade Tudela and Chus Martínez speak about the exhibition "#01 Armando Andrade Tudela. ahir, demà" at Ràdio Web MACBA
Carl Freedman Gallery
#01 Armando Andrade Tudela. ahir, demà An Armando Andrade Tudela exhibition at MACBA, Barcelona
Armando Andrade Tudela podcast and video interview on the exhibition #01 Armando Andrade Tudela. ahir, demà
Armando Andrade Tudela Seuil de rétablissement, an Armando Andrade Tudela at Le Grand Café, centre d'art contemporain, Saint-Nazaire (F)

1975 births
Living people
People from Lima
Peruvian artists
Pontifical Catholic University of Peru alumni